Merrill Everett Moore (26 September 1923 – 14 June 2000) was an American swing and boogie-woogie pianist and bandleader whose style influenced rockabilly music during the 1950s.

He was born in Algona, Iowa, and learned piano as a child.  By the age of 12 he was performing occasionally on a Des Moines radio station.  After leaving school he joined the Chuck Hall Band, which played in local ballrooms, before serving in the US Navy during World War II.  He then married, and moved with his wife to Tucson, Arizona and then San Diego, where he worked as a clothes salesman and performed in clubs, often with guitarist Arkie Geurin. He became a full-time musician in 1950, and formed his own band, the Saddle, Rock and Rhythm Boys, who played boogie-woogie and Western swing at the Buckaroo Club.  He signed with Capitol Records in 1952 and recorded a string of singles, the most successful of which was a version of "The House of Blue Lights" in 1953.  Ken Nelson of Capitol Records invited him to take part in a national tour, but Jimmy Kennedy, the owner of the Buckaroo Club, refused to allow Moore to break his contract to take part.

According to Steve Huey of Allmusic, Moore's "unique style fused Western swing, boogie-woogie, and early R&B in a melting pot that many critics felt was a distinct influence on rockabilly, especially Jerry Lee Lewis."  His music was later highly regarded by rockabilly fans, especially in Europe, although Moore himself said: "We didn't have the idea we were pioneering anything. We were just trying to make a living.... Rock and roll to me was a completely different sound. The rhythm section was incomplete, it was too hard, and it didn't swing...."

Moore continued to record for Capitol in the 1950s, but in 1955 walked out on his contract with Kennedy and moved to Los Angeles.  There, he became a regular, along with Tennessee Ernie Ford, on Cliffie Stone's radio program Hometown Jamboree, and also worked as a session pianist for Capitol, appearing on records by Tommy Sands, Johnny Cash, Faron Young, Kay Starr and others. In 1962 he moved back to San Diego, and returned to playing hotels and clubs.

He died from cancer in 2000, at the age of 76.

Discography

References

External links
Discography at Rockin' Country Style

1923 births
2000 deaths
People from Algona, Iowa
Musicians from Iowa
American jazz pianists
American male pianists
Boogie-woogie pianists
20th-century American pianists
20th-century American male musicians
American male jazz musicians
United States Navy personnel of World War II